Hundar Monastery, also known as Hundar Gompa,  is a Buddhist monastery in Hundar village, in the Nubra Valley of Ladakh, northern India. It is located near the Diskit Monastery and Lachung Temple,  just below the main road near the bridge.

Footnotes

Buddhist monasteries in Ladakh
Tibetan Buddhist monasteries and temples in India